The FMP Qualt 201 is a Czech ultralight and light-sport aircraft, designed and produced by FMP s.r.o. of Prague. The aircraft is supplied as a complete ready-to-fly-aircraft.

Design and development
The Qualt 201 was derived from the earlier FMP Qualt 200, which it replaced in production. The 201 was designed to comply with the Fédération Aéronautique Internationale microlight rules and US light-sport aircraft rules. It features a cantilever low-wing, a two-seats-in-side-by-side configuration enclosed open cockpit under a bubble canopy, fixed conventional landing gear, a T-tail and a single engine in tractor configuration.

The aircraft is made from composites. Standard engines available are the  Rotax 582 two-stroke, the  Rotax 912UL, the  Rotax 912ULS and the  Jabiru 2200 four-stroke powerplants.

Specifications (Qualt 201)

References

External links

2000s Czech ultralight aircraft
Light-sport aircraft
Single-engined tractor aircraft